Manipur has a wide collection of notable art and cultural displays.

Performing Arts

Thang Ta 
Thang Ta is a martial art form of Manipur, existing since time immemorial. The art is associated with swords and spears. For defence, a shield is mostly used.

Manipuri Raas Leela 

Manipuri Raas Leela is the classical dance of Indian state of Manipur, with its main theme being devotion to god Krishna. It depicts the Raslila pastime of Krishna with Radha and gopis.

Lai Haraoba 
Lai Haraoba is the traditional religious festival, celebrated in regards to the holy sacred groves Umang Lai of the state.

Shumang Kumhei
Shumang Kumhei is a traditional form of theater, originated in the state. four open air form, with a 13×13 sq. ft. of area.

Literature 
Meitei literature has its earliest roots of existence dating back to around 11th century AD.

The ancient Manipuri literary works are done in Puya (Meitei texts) written in Meitei script.

Some of the prominent writers of Meitei literature are:

 M. K. Binodini Devi 
 Khwairakpam Chaoba

Indigenous Religion 
Manipur is the home to the ancient indigenous religion of Sanamahism, a Polytheism of thousands of deities.

Folklore

Folk dances 

Khamba-Thoibi Dance
Thabal chongba
Pung cholom
Manipuri Sankirtana

Festivals 
Several ethnic groups in the state, celebrates various festivals throughout the year. A few of them are:
 Lai Haraoba
 Cheiraoba
 Yaosang
 Ningol Chakouba
 Panthoibi Iratpa
 Imoinu Iratpa
 Mera Hou Chongba
 Mera Chaorel Houba
 Sanamahi Ahong Khong Chingba
 Kwaak Taanba
 Heikru Hidongba
 Gaan-Ngai

Sports 
Forms of indigenous sports are:

 Yubi Lakpi
 Mukna
 Khong kangjei

See also 
Art forms of Manipur
Meitei mythology
Tourist attractions in Manipur

References

External links
 Manipur Government Website

Culture of Manipur